Maurice K. Temerlin (January 15, 1924 – January 15, 1988), was a psychologist and author.

Life

Research

Suggestion Effects of Psychiatric Labels 
In the late 1960s and early 1970s, Temerlin published a series of articles examining the effect of diagnostic labels. Temerlin and his colleagues asked clinicians to evaluate and diagnose a man. Before making their diagnosis, they were told that an 'expert' had previously diagnosed the individual as 'psychotic'. The man was in fact a mentally healthy individual who was a confederate of the experimenters. Even though the man did not present with symptoms of psychosis, many clinicians agreed with the 'expert' diagnosis.

Work with Lucy 
With his wife Jane W. Temerlin, Temerlin raised a chimpanzee named Lucy  who was owned by the Institute for Primate Studies at the University of Oklahoma at Norman, Oklahoma.  Temerlin and his wife raised Lucy in their home as if she were a human child, teaching her to eat with silverware, dress herself, flip through magazines, and sit in a chair at the dinner table. She was taught American Sign Language by primatologist Roger Fouts as part of an ape language project.  Temerlin wrote the book Lucy: Growing Up Human: A Chimpanzee Daughter in a Psychotherapist's Family, analyzing the chimp's behaviour and describing her life.

'Psychotherapy Cults' 
Temerlin collaborated academically with his wife on articles, including "Psychotherapy Cults: An Iatrogenic Perversion," which was published in Psychotherapy: Theory, Research, and Practice.  The work remains highly regarded, and is cited by numerous academicians, including Robert S. Pepper, Michael Langone, Guy Fielding and Sue Llewelyn, David A. Halperin, and Arnold Markowitz, and  Dennis Tourish and Pauline Irving.

Publications

Books
Lucy: Growing Up Human: A Chimpanzee Daughter in a Psychotherapist's Family, Temerlin, Maurice. 1976 
Labelling Madness, Contributor, "Suggestion Effects in Psychiatric Diagnosis,"  Thomas J. Scheff, (ed.), Prentice-Hall, Inc., Englewood Cliffs, New Jersey, 1975.
The Social Psychology of Clinical Diagnosis, University of Oklahoma, Dept. of Psychology 1966

Articles
"Some Hazards of the Therapeutic Relationship", Jane W. Temerlin, M. S. W., Maurice K. Temerlin, Ph. D., Cultic Studies Journal
Diagnostic Bias in Community Mental Health, Community Mental Health Journal, Volume 6, Number 2 / April, 1970

See also
Lucy (chimpanzee)
List of cult and new religious movement researchers

References

20th-century American psychologists
Researchers of new religious movements and cults
1924 births
1988 deaths
Psychotherapists